Aleph Book Company is an Indian publishing company. It was founded in May 2011 by David Davidar, a novelist, publisher and former president of Penguin Books Canada, in association with R. K. Mehra and Kapish Mehra of Rupa Publications. The headquarters of the company is situated in New Delhi.

Genesis 
On his return to India from Canada where he served as the president of Penguin Canada, David Davidar partnered Rupa Publications to found Aleph Book Company in May 2011. The key people at the time of inception were R. K. Mehra and Kapish Mehra of Rupa Publications, besides Davidar.  The headquarters of the company is at New Delhi and the logo was designed by Rymn Massand, an inspiration from Aleph, the first letter of many of the semitic abjads.

Business profile 
The company publishes both fiction and non-fiction and has an author profile ranging from lesser known writers to established ones such as Romila Thapar, Shashi Tharoor, Khushwant Singh, Cyrus Mistry, Ruskin Bond, Rajmohan Gandhi and Vikram Seth, among others. With a focus on Indian and other South Asian countries, the company publishes books in various genres including fiction, history, biography, autobiography, current events, reportage, travel, popular science, art, music, nature studies, the environment, business, translations, philosophy, sociology, psychology and popular culture. Some of its publications have received various literary awards such as DSC Prize for South Asian Literature, Sahitya Akademi Award and Ramnath Goenka Award. It regularly publishes its catalog under the title, The Book of Aleph.

Selected publications

References

External links

 

Book publishing company imprints
Publishing companies established in 2011
2011 establishments in Delhi
Book publishing companies of India
Companies based in New Delhi